Brian Connor may refer to:
 Brian Connor (pastor)
 Brian Connor (footballer)
 Brian Connor (visual effects artist)

See also
 Brian O'Connor (disambiguation)